Gan Quan (born June 17, 1996) is a Chinese baseball pitcher who plays with the Sichuan Dragons in the China Baseball League. He currently plays with the Texas AirHogs of the American Association.

Gan represented China at the 2017 World Baseball Classic and 2018 Asian Games.

References

1996 births
Living people
Asian Games competitors for China
Baseball pitchers
Baseball players at the 2018 Asian Games
Chinese expatriate baseball players in the United States
Sichuan Dragons players
Texas AirHogs players
2017 World Baseball Classic players
21st-century Chinese people